The Robert Smalls House is a historic house at 511 Prince Street in Beaufort, South Carolina.  Built in 1843 and altered several times, the house was designated a National Historic Landmark in 1974 for its association with Robert Smalls (1839-1915).  Smalls, born into slavery, achieved notice for commandeering the CSS Planter and sailing her to freedom during the American Civil War.  After the war he represented South Carolina in the United States House of Representatives during Reconstruction.

Description and history
The Robert Smalls House is located in central Beaufort, at the northeast corner of Prince and New Streets.  It is a two-story wood-frame structure, with a side gable roof and a two-story porch extending across its (south-facing) front facade.  A two-story ell extends to the rear, giving the house a basic T shape.  The house was built in 1843, originally with a single-story porch and ell, which were expanded to two stories in 1850 and 1870.

Robert Smalls was born into slavery in 1839, and spent most of his early years in this house, where his master (and father) was Henry McKee (Son of John McKee).  Around 1851 he was hired out by McKee to work in Charleston, where he worked on the docks, and eventually learned to sail.  In 1862, during the American Civil War, he successfully commandeered the Planter, sailing her to the blockading Union fleet.  He later served in the Union Navy, and became involved in South Carolina politics after the war.  His bravery was made a key argument in favor of the Union Army's enlistment of African-American soldiers.

See also
List of National Historic Landmarks in South Carolina
National Register of Historic Places listings in Beaufort County, South Carolina

References

External links
Robert Smalls House, Beaufort County (511 Prince St., Beaufort), with six photos, at South Carolina Department of Archives and History

Historic American Buildings Survey in South Carolina
National Historic Landmarks in South Carolina
Houses in Beaufort, South Carolina
Houses on the National Register of Historic Places in South Carolina
Houses completed in 1839
National Register of Historic Places in Beaufort County, South Carolina
Historic district contributing properties in South Carolina